Abbayya Prasad is an Indian Politician who is serving as Member of the legislative assembly for Hubli-Dharwad East constituency.

Constituency
He represents the Hubli-Dharwad-East constituency.

Political Party
He is from the Indian National Congress.

References 

Living people
Indian National Congress politicians from Karnataka
Indian National Congress politicians
Karnataka MLAs 2013–2018
Karnataka MLAs 2018–2023
1968 births